Jean Freustié, also known as Jean Pierre Teurlay (October 3, 1914 – June 5, 1983) was a French writer and literary critic. He won the 1969 Prix du roman de la société des gens de lettres, and 1970 Prix Renaudot, for Isabelle ou l'arrière-saison.

Biography 
Freustié was raised in a wealthy family whose father was a wine merchant. After his secondary education at the Institution of Montesquieu Libourne, he studied medicine at the Faculty of Medicine of Bordeaux and then in Algiers. He interned at the Hospital of Bordeaux in 1936, then he moved to Paris where he became a medical officer in 1950.

He attended the café Le Procope, with Jacques Brenner and Claude Perdriel, and their literary magazine, Le Cahier des saisons. He knew Françoise Sagan, Bernard Frank, Jean-Louis Curtis and Francis Nourissier, and met with great writers like Jacques Chardonne, Paul Morand, Jean Cocteau and Eugène Ionesco.

Freustié wrote for the France Observateur as a literary critic beginning in 1961. Retaining his position as literary critic for the Nouvel Observateur in 1964, he was also literary adviser to Denoël.

The Prix Jean-Freustié is awarded annually.
His papers are held at l'Institut Mémoires de l'édition contemporaine.

Works
 Ne délivrer que sur ordonnance (Do to prescription), éditions de la Table ronde, 1952; Gallimard, 1974
 Marthe ou les Amants tristes 1958; Table ronde, 1978
 Les Filles La Table ronde, 1959
 Un autre été La Table ronde, 1961
 La Passerelle (The Bridge), Grasset, 1963, Roger Nimier Prize
Les Collines de l’Est B. Grasset, 1967. short stories
 Isabelle ou l'arrière-saison La Table ronde, 1970; W. H. Allen, 1972, ; La Table Ronde, 1980, 
 L'héritage du vent (Legacy of the Wind), Stock, 1979; Gallimard, 1983, 
 L'entracte algérien (Algerian Intermission), Balland, 1982; Paris-Méditerranée, 2001,

Sources
Salim Jay, Jean Freustié, romancier de la sincérité, Editions du Rocher, 1998,

References

External links 
https://web.archive.org/web/20120402035331/http://www.ledilettante.com/fiche-auteur.asp?Clef=231

People from Libourne
1914 births
1983 deaths
Prix Renaudot winners
Roger Nimier Prize winners
French literary critics
20th-century French novelists
20th-century French journalists
French male novelists
20th-century French male writers
French male non-fiction writers